Gol Qeshlaq (also Romanized as Gol Qeshlāq and Golqeshlāq; also known as Gol Qeshlāqī) is a village in Sanjabad-e Gharbi Rural District, in the Central District of Kowsar County, Ardabil Province, Iran. At the 2006 census, its population was 15, in 6 families.

References 

Towns and villages in Kowsar County